The Flying Dutchman was a sailing event on the Sailing at the 1988 Summer Olympics program in Pusan, South Korea. Seven races were scheduled. 44 sailors, on 22 boats, from 22 nations competed. The second race falling on the Jewish most holy day of the "Yom Kipur" prevented the Israeli duo Sela and Amir from sailing thus pushing them out of the medals.

Results 

DNF = Did Not Finish, DSQ = Disqualified, PMS = Premature Start
Crossed out results did not count for the total result.
 = Male,  = Female

Daily standings

Notes

References 
 
 
 

Flying Dutchman
Flying Dutchman (dinghy)
Unisex sailing at the Summer Olympics